Karadere  is a town in Fethiye district of Muğla Province, Turkey.

In 1998 Karadere was declared a seat of township. In 2014 it was included in the newly established Seydikemer district.

Patara beaches are situated to the southeast of Karadere.

References

Populated places in Muğla Province
Mediterranean Region, Turkey
Towns in Turkey
Fethiye District